al-Muqri may refer to:

Ahmed Mohammed al-Maqqari, 16th century historian
Muhammad al-Muqri, 19th–20th century statesman